Seventh Heaven is a 2015 Israeli hand-drawn musical comedy short film directed by Or Tilinger and produced by Minshar For Art. It made its world premiere on January 25, 2015, at the 31st annual KidFilm Festival.

Premise
An earthquake leads a young shepherd with sheep into a fantastic and comic quest to return home.

Voice cast
Ben Knister as Jasio
Mazal Damasya
Miriam Workia
Or Tilinger
Rachel Frenkel
Lior Frenkel

Accolades
Seventh Heaven won four awards. The short participated in over 70 film festivals around the world.

References

External links

2015 films
2010s animated short films
Israeli animated short films
2010s musical comedy films
2015 comedy films
Israeli musical comedy films